"Mambo Mambo - The Best of Lou Bega" is the second compilation album by Lou Bega released in 2004. It includes songs from his previous albums A Little Bit of Mambo' and "Ladies and Gentlemen".

Track listing
"Mambo No. 5 (A Little Bit of...)"
 "Tricky, Tricky "
 "Mambo Mambo"
 "Can I Tico Tico You"
 "Icecream"
 "Trumpet, Pt. 2"
 "Lady"
 "Yeah Yeah"
 "Club Elitaire "
 "People Lovin' Me"

Credits

Composers
Frank Lio
Lou Bega
Peter Hoff
D. Fact
Christian Pletschacher
Prado Perez
Pérez Prado

References

2004 greatest hits albums
Lou Bega albums